Tamaki is a village in the Qarabagh District of Ghazni Province in Afghanistan, very close to Jaghori District. Tamaki is populated by Hazara people. The 10,000 to 15,000 people in Tamaki speak either Hazaragi or Dari and their religion is Shia Islam. Tamaki village has places called Taqchin, Qol, warqa, Nala, Blandqash and Qani and the center place is called Deh Raazi which is in Qani place. More than 1500 students are studying in four high schools in Tamaki village, two schools for boys and two schools for girls as called Tawhid Tamaki, and Mostalat Taqchin Tamaki.

See also 
 Qarabagh District
 Ghazni Province

References 
 https://www.ecoi.net/local_link/346419/490322_de.html
 https://thetamakitimes.wordpress.com/photos/

Populated places in Ghazni Province
Villages in Afghanistan